Mount Bona is one of the major mountains of the Saint Elias Mountains in eastern Alaska, and is the fifth-highest independent peak in the United States.  It is either the tenth- or eleventh-highest peak in North America. Mount Bona and its adjacent neighbor Mount Churchill are both large ice-covered stratovolcanoes.  Bona has the distinction of being the highest volcano in the United States and the fourth-highest in North America, outranked only by the three highest Mexican volcanoes, Pico de Orizaba, Popocatépetl, and Iztaccíhuatl. Its summit  is a small stratovolcano on top of a high platform of sedimentary rocks.

The mountain's massif is covered almost entirely by icefields and glaciers, and it is the principal source of ice for the Klutlan Glacier, which flows east for over  into the Yukon Territory of Canada. The mountain also contributes a large volume of ice to the north-flowing Russell Glacier system.

He named it after the Bona, his racing yacht.
The mountain was first climbed in 1930 by Allen Carpé, Terris Moore, and Andrew Taylor, from the Russell Glacier on the west of the peak. The current standard route is the East Ridge; a climb of nearby Mount Churchill is a relatively easy addition via this route as well.


Elevation 
Mount Bona's exact elevation is uncertain. However, USGS 1:63,360 topographical maps do not show a spot height, and their contour lines indicate a summit elevation of 16,55050 feet (504515 meters). Many sources quote the latter figure.

See also

List of mountain peaks of North America
List of mountain peaks of the United States
List of mountain peaks of Alaska
List of the highest major summits of the United States
List of the most prominent summits of the United States
List of the most isolated major summits of the United States
List of volcanoes in the United States

References and notes

Notes

References

Further Reading

External links

 Mount Bona at the Alaska Volcano Observatory
 
 

Landforms of Copper River Census Area, Alaska
Mountains of Alaska
Mountains of Unorganized Borough, Alaska
Mount Bona
Saint Elias Mountains
Stratovolcanoes of the United States
Subduction volcanoes
Volcanoes of Alaska
Volcanoes of Unorganized Borough, Alaska
Wrangell–St. Elias National Park and Preserve